Battle of Babylon may refer to:
 In Mesopotamia:
 Battle of Babylon (634), between the forces of Sassanid Empire and Rashidun Caliphate 
 Battle of Babylon (636), between the forces of Sassanid Empire and Rashidun Caliphate
 In Egypt:
 Siege of Babylon Fortress, between the forces of Byzantine Empire and Rashidun Caliphate

See also
Fall of Babylon
Siege of Babylon